Lavirint (trans. Labyrinth) is the eighth studio album by Serbian rock band Van Gogh. The album was released in 2009 through Mobile Telephony of Serbia.

Track listing
 "Lavirint (Intro)"
 "Nek' te telo nosi"
 "Tik-tak"
 "Pipi"
 "Aerodrom"
 "Lepa žena"
 "Kidaš moj svet"
 "Rođendan"
 "Meni nije ni do čega"
 "Ona i ja"
 "Kad znam da ne voliš me"

Van Gogh (band) albums
2009 albums